Filippo Drago may refer to:
 Filippo Drago (pharmacologist)
 Filippo Drago (rugby union)